Fairbank is an unincorporated community in Fayette County, Pennsylvania, United States. Fairbank has a post office, with ZIP code 15435, which opened on July 30, 1906.

References

Unincorporated communities in Fayette County, Pennsylvania
Unincorporated communities in Pennsylvania